Francois Anton "FA" Meiring  (born 24 August 1967) is a South African former rugby union player.

Playing career
As a schoolboy, Meiring represented  at the 1986 Craven Week tournament after which he was selected for the South African Schools team. In 1994 he toured with the Springboks to New Zealand. Meiring did not play in any test matches but played in seven tour matches, scoring two tries for the Springboks.

See also
List of South Africa national rugby union players – Springbok no. 612
List of South Africa national under-18 rugby union team players

References

1967 births
Living people
South African rugby union players
South Africa international rugby union players
Eastern Province Elephants players
Blue Bulls players
People from Somerset East
Rugby union players from the Eastern Cape
Rugby union centres
Rugby union wings